John Twisleton-Wykeham-Fiennes, 17th Baron Saye and Sele  (28 February 1830 – 8 October 1907) was an English peer and first-class cricketer.

Biography 
The son of Frederick Fiennes, he was born in February 1830 at Adlestrop, Gloucestershire. He was educated at Harrow School, before matriculating at Christ Church, Oxford in 1849. He later played first-class cricket for the Marylebone Cricket Club from 1850 to 1852, making five appearances. Fiennes scored 33 runs in his five matches, with a high score of 11 not out.

In June 1852, he was appointed a deputy lieutenant for Oxfordshire. Fiennes also served in the army with the Queen's Own Oxfordshire Hussars, enlisting in 1852 as a cornet. He was promoted to lieutenant in April 1858 and captain in April 1860. He succeeded his father as 17th Baron Saye and Sele upon his death in May 1887. Fiennes was later present at the Coronation of Edward VII at Westminster Abbey in 1902. Among the offices was a county alderman and justice of the peace for Oxfordshire, in addition to being a justice of the peace for Warwickshire, Middlesex and Westminster. Fiennes died in October 1907 at Broughton, Oxfordshire. He was succeeded as Baron Saye and Sele by his son, Geoffrey Twisleton-Wykeham-Fiennes.

References

External links

1830 births
1907 deaths
People from Cotswold District
People educated at Harrow School
Alumni of Christ Church, Oxford
English cricketers
Marylebone Cricket Club cricketers
Deputy Lieutenants of Oxfordshire
Queen's Own Oxfordshire Hussars officers
English justices of the peace
Fiennes family
Barons Saye and Sele